USS LST-935 was an  in the United States Navy. Like many of her class, she was not named and is properly referred to by her hull designation.

Construction
LST-935 was laid down on 3 July 1944, at Hingham, Massachusetts, by the Bethlehem-Hingham Shipyard; launched on 5 August 1944; and commissioned on 29 August 1944.

Service history
During World War II, LST-935 was assigned to the Asiatic-Pacific theater and participated in the Palawan Island landings in March 1945, the Mindanao Island landings in March and April 1945, the Visayan Island landings in April 1945, and the Balikpapan operation in June and July 1945.

Following the war, LST-935 performed occupation duty in the Far East and saw service in China until mid-April 1946. She was decommissioned on 2 July 1946, and struck from the Navy list on 15 August, that same year. The ship was sold to Consolidated Builders, Inc., Seattle, Washington, on 29 August 1947, for scrapping.

Awards
LST-935 earned two battle star for World War II service.

Notes

Citations

Bibliography 

Online resources

External links
 

 

LST-542-class tank landing ships
World War II amphibious warfare vessels of the United States
Ships built in Hingham, Massachusetts
1944 ships